Gary Smith (March 28, 1958 - January 16, 2023) was an American businessman, record producer, and artist's manager, known for his work recording albums by alternative rock musicians since the mid-1980s at Fort Apache Studios. Smith, who was sole owner of the studio, first became a partner co-owning the studio business in the late 1980s, moving it from Cambridge, Massachusetts, to Bellows Falls, Vermont, in 2002.

A Rhode Island native, Smith gave supportive early guidance to Newport, Rhode Island's Throwing Muses group, advising them to move to Boston's burgeoning alternative music scene in 1986. That year he saw a new band called the Pixies opening for Throwing Muses at The Rat in Boston and convinced them to let him produce their first demos, known as The Purple Tape, in spring 1987 at an early incarnation of Fort Apache's studio digs, then a "ramshackle" building in a dangerous neighborhood. Since joining Fort Apache in the mid-1980s, Smith produced dozens of influential recordings, including the Pixies' Come On Pilgrim EP on the 4AD and Rough Trade Records labels. Other artists he produced include  Throwing Muses, Tanya Donelly, Blake Babies, The Connells, Juliana Hatfield, Scrawl, 10,000 Maniacs, and Billy Bragg.

Smith resided in New Hampshire across the border from his Vermont studio. Smith built Fort Apache into the name of an umbrella company from which he operated several businesses: the Fort Apache Studios business (using a second name, Windham Studios), a real estate and concert promotions business called Historea Properties, and an artist's management business representing talent such as Tanya Donelly and Natalie Merchant. Smith maintained a "Screed" blog at the Fort Apache website.

Smith died of cancer on January 16, 2023.

Production discography
 Pixies - Come On Pilgrim (September 1987)
 Throwing Muses - House Tornado (March 1988)
 Throwing Muses - Hunkpapa (January 1989)
 Blake Babies - Earwig (1989)
 The Connells - Fun & Games (1990)
 The Chills - Submarine Bells (1990)
 Blake Babies - Sunburn (1990)
 Blake Babies - Rosy Jack World EP (1991)
 The Feelies - Time for a Witness (March 1991)
 Juliana Hatfield - Hey Babe (March 1992)
 Juliana Hatfield - Forever Baby (1992)

References

 Erlewine, Stephen Thomas. [ Pixies Biography]. Allmusic. Retrieved Apr. 20, 2005.
 Fort Apache Selected Discography. Fort Apache Studios website. Retrieved Apr. 18, 2005.
 Harvard, Joe (1998). Articles on Fort Apache. Boston Rock Storybook webpages. Retrieved Apr. 18, 2005.
 Harvard, Joe (November 2002). Part 4, Fort Apache North: Music Business Blues. Boston Rock Storybook webpages. Retrieved Apr. 18, 2005.
 Harvard, Joe (December 10, 2002). Joe Harvard: Bits and Pieces. Boston Rock Storybook webpages. Retrieved Apr. 18, 2005.
 ""An Interview With Tanya Donelly". (January 26, 2005). Boston Beats. Retrieved Apr. 13, 2005.
 Smith, Gary (1997). Pixies Biography. Hip Online. Retrieved Apr. 20, 2005.

External links
 Fort Apache official site
 

1958 births
2023 deaths
People from Bellows Falls, Vermont
People from Rhode Island
Record producers from Rhode Island
Record producers from Vermont